Porteus is a surname. Notable people with the surname include:

 Beilby Porteus (1731–1809), Church of England bishop
 Hugh Gordon Porteus (1906–1993)
 Ian Porteous (born 1964), Scottish footballer
 Ian R. Porteous (1930–2011), Scottish mathematician
 Joe Porteus (1925–1995), English professional footballer
 Morgan Porteus (1917–2019), American Episcopalian bishop
 Stanley Porteus (1883–1972), Australian psychologist

See also
 Porteus (operating system)
 Porteous (disambiguation)